FOSCO International School (FIS) is an international school located in District 3 of Ho Chi Minh City, Vietnam.  It is under the control of FOSCO, whose main purpose is that of a service company to foreign missions.

FIS operates using the American-based curriculum and its core standards for students ranging from 18 months (nursery school) to 12 years of age (Grade 6).  The regular school year runs from mid-August to mid-September, and summer school July to August.

International schools in Vietnam